Peter Muhlenberg, or John Peter Gabriel Muhlenberg,  is an 1889 marble sculpture depicting the American clergyman, soldier, and politician of the same name by Blanche Nevin, installed in the United States Capitol's crypt, in Washington, D.C., as part of the National Statuary Hall Collection. It is one of two statues donated by the state of Pennsylvania. The statue was accepted into the collection on February 28, 1889, by Pennsylvania Congressman Daniel Ermentrout.

Nevin produced the statue in Carrara, Italy, likely utilizing the skilled marble carvers there. Rubenstein in her work American Women Sculptors calls the statue a “rather effeminate figure in colonial garb,” while Taft in his History of American Sculpture is less kind, calling the statue “insignificant”.

See also
 1889 in art

References

External links
 

1889 establishments in Washington, D.C.
1889 sculptures
Marble sculptures in Washington, D.C.
Muhlenberg
Sculptures of men in Washington, D.C.